Wushantou Dam is an embankment dam in Guantian District, Tainan, Taiwan. The dam was designed by Yoichi Hatta and built between 1920 and 1930 during Japanese rule to provide irrigation water for the Chianan Plain as part of the Chianan Irrigation system. Because the natural flow of the Guantian River and other local streams was insufficient for irrigation of a planned , a tunnel was constructed to divert water from the Zengwen River to fill the reservoir. In 1974, the Zengwen Dam was completed on the Zengwen River shortly above the diversion tunnel, stabilizing and reducing the sediment load of water flowing into Wushantou Reservoir.

The reservoir comprises  and was designed to store  of water. However, as of 1990 it had been reduced to  due to severe erosion problems upstream. The dam sits at the head of a  catchment area, which increases to  when including the portion of the Zengwen River watershed diverted into the reservoir.

See also
 List of dams and reservoirs in Taiwan

References

1930 establishments in Taiwan
Dams completed in 1930
Dams in Tainan
Embankment dams